Paula Montgomery née Paula Smith (born 1971) is an Irish international lawn bowler.

Bowls career
She represented Ireland at Under 25 level (as Paula Smith) from 1991 to 1996, gaining 18 junior international caps. Montgomery then represented Ireland at Senior level from 1997 to 2004 before taking a three-year sabbatical and returning to international duty in 2008, competing each year in the British Isles Women's Home International Series, the most recent of which was 2019 and captained the International team in 2018 & 2019.  She currently has 74 Senior International caps.

Montgomery has represented Northern Ireland at two Commonwealth Games; in the pairs event at the 1998 Commonwealth Games in Kuala Lumpur 1998 (Lead in Pairs with Barbara Cameron - 5th place) and the fours event at the 2002 Commonwealth Games in Manchester (playing position of 2nd in Fours with Alicia Weir, Dessa Baird & Pat Horner - Quarter Finalists).

Montgomery has also represented Ireland at various international events including the Atlantic Bowls Championships in Llandrindod Wells, Wales (1997) and Paphos, Cyprus (2011) where she won the fours bronze medal. In 2012, she represented Ireland at the 2012 World Outdoor Bowls Championship in Adelaide, Australia competing in the pairs and the fours events.

At national level she won the 2002 and 2009 pairs titles and 2001 triples title at the Irish National Bowls Championships and subsequently won two British Isles Bowls Championships triples in the 2002 and pairs in 2010. Additionally she won the Irish U25 singles in 1994, 1995 & 1997 (as Paula Smith).

Montgomery was assistant manager to the Under 25 Women's Irish International team in 2014 and has been part of the coaching and selection committee since then.

Personal life
She is married to former Irish International bowler Alan Montgomery.

References

Female lawn bowls players from Northern Ireland
1971 births
Living people
Bowls players at the 1998 Commonwealth Games
Bowls players at the 2002 Commonwealth Games